Alfred Kütt (17 September 1894 Roela Parish (now Vinni Parish), Wierland County – ?) was an Estonian politician. He was a member of II Riigikogu, representing the Settlers' Party. On 19 August 1924, he resigned his position and he was replaced by Johannes Krass.

References

1894 births
Year of death missing
People from Vinni Parish
People from Kreis Wierland
Settlers' Party politicians
Members of the Riigikogu, 1923–1926